The pulp and paper industry in Canada is one of the country's most important and profitable industries.. It is especially concentrated in Ontario and Quebec and plays an important role in many other provinces..

Leading companies 

The leading forest and paper products companies in Canada in net sales in 2012 were:

Environmental expenses 
In 2000, Canadian pulp, paper and paperboard companies had operating expenses of C$425.4 million on environmental protection with the majority ($263.3 million) used for pollution abatement. Capital expenditures totalled $234.8 million, with over half ($140.4 million) being spent on pollution prevention processes.

See also

 Bleaching of wood pulp
 Canadian Pulp and Paper Association
 Charles Fenerty
 Forestry in Canada
 Paper and pulp industry in Dryden, Ontario

References

External links
TAPPI Technical Association of the Pulp and Paper Industry
 Forest Products Association of Canada
 An Update on the Paper and Allied Products Industry (Statistics Canada, 1999)
 Canadian Industry Statistics (Strategis)
 Pulp and Paper Technical Association of Canada (PAPTAC)

 
Forestry in Canada